Richard Engel (born 1973) is an American journalist.

Richard Engel, Rich Engel, Rick Engel, or Dick Engel may refer to:

Dick Engel, manager of Bibletone Records
Richard Engel, Canadian teacher who helper popularize Sepak takraw in Canada
Rich Engel, 2012 parade marshal at Picnic Day (UC Davis)
Rich Engel, interviewee about singer Angela Bofill; see List of Unsung episodes

See also
Richard Engle (disambiguation)
Richard Engels (disambiguation)
Richard Stengel (born c. 1955), American editor, journalist and author